Braehead is a commercial development in Renfrew, Scotland.

Braehead may also refer to:

 Braehead, Banchory, a proposed housing development in Aberdeenshire, Scotland
 Braehead, Dumfries and Galloway, a location
 Braehead, Orkney, a location
 Braehead, Ayr, South Ayrshire, a location
 Braehead, South Lanarkshire, three villages and hamlets in South Lanarkshire, Scotland
 Braehead, East Kilbride, a location
 Braehead, Lanark, a location
 Braehead, Stirling, a location
 Braehead (Fredericksburg, Virginia), an American historic house